The Cuba women's national water polo team represents Cuba in international women's water polo competitions.

Results

World Championship
2005 — 9th place
2007 — 15th place
2011 — 10th place
2019 — 15th place

See also
 Cuba men's national water polo team

References

 
Women's national water polo teams